Perfect Sound Forever (1991) is the third EP by American indie rock band Pavement. It was released as a 10" on Chicago's Drag City recording label. Its songs were later made available on the Drag City compilation Westing (by Musket & Sextant).

Background 
The EP's name came from a line in Sony's 1982 advertising campaign for the first compact discs, which assured potential buyers of the ultimate in both fidelity and longevity.

Village Voice writer Michaelangelo Matos noted Perfect Sound Forever and the band's 1990 EP, Demolition Plot J-7, as "epochal to ... sloppy early-'90s undergrads."

Track listing
All tracks were written by Stephen Malkmus and Scott Kannberg.
 "Heckler Spray" – 1:06
 "From Now On" – 2:03
 "Angel Carver Blues/Mellow Jazz Docent" – 2:30
 "Drive-by Fader" – 0:28
 "Debris Slide" – 1:56
 "Home" – 2:23
 "Krell Vid-User" – 1:26

Personnel

Pavement 

 Stephen Malkmus – lead vocals, guitar
 Scott Kannberg – backing vocals, guitar, bass
 Gary Young – drums

References

Jovanovic, Rob (2004). Perfect Sound Forever: The Story of Pavement. (Boston) Justin, Charles & Co. .

External links
 Perfect Sound Forever at Drag City
 

1991 EPs
Pavement (band) albums
Drag City (record label) EPs
Lo-fi music EPs